Robert Moor (17 July 1889 – 23 December 1972) was a French actor.

Selected filmography

 Une jeune fille et un million (1932) - Pimpant
 Riri et Nono en vacances (1932)
 Le soir des rois (1933) - Ferdinand Albaret
 The Abbot Constantine (1933) - Comte de Larnac
 Knock, ou le triomphe de la médecine (1933) - L'instituteur
 Étienne (1933) - Le directeur
 Madame Bovary (1934) - Doorman (uncredited)
 They Were Five (1936) - Un locataire
 The Man from Nowhere (1937) - Le fossoyeur
 The Red Dancer (1937)
 Le cantinier de la coloniale (1937) - (uncredited)
 Aloha, le chant des îles (1937)
 Rasputin (1938) - Maître-d'hôtel d'Ania (uncredited)
 Street Without Joy (1938) - (uncredited)
 L'ange que j'ai vendu (1938)
 Café de Paris (1938) - Un agent
 Sirocco (1938) - Le domestique de Chervin (uncredited)
 The Curtain Rises (1938) - Albert, le concierge (uncredited)
 Monsieur Coccinelle (1938) - Un médecin
 La route enchantée (1938) - Le duc de Bocanegra père
 Je chante (1938) - Béranger
 Thérèse Martin (1939) - M. Guérin
 Behind the Facade (1939) - Un agent (uncredited)
 La Loi du Nord (1939) - Parker
 Menaces... (1940) - Le philatéliste
 La croisée des chemins (1942) - Emile
 Les petits riens (1942)
 A Woman in the Night (1943) - Le baron Hochecorne
 Ne le criez pas sur les toits (1943) - Le deuxième commanditaire
 Arlette and Love (1943) - Mathurin
 My First Love (1945) - Firmin
 Marie la Misère (1945)
 Girl with Grey Eyes (1945)
 Hanged Man's Farm (1945) - Le notaire
 Raboliot (1946)
 Les gosses mènent l'enquête (1947) - Un professeur
 Miroir (1947) - Antoine
 Fantômas (1947) - Le professeur Cauchard
 La grande Maguet (1947) - Le médecin
 Si jeunesse savait... (1948) - Le médecin
 Man to Men (1948) - Un valet (uncredited)
 Fantomas Against Fantomas (1949) - Le médecin légiste
 Tous les deux (1949) - Un employé
 Du Guesclin (1949) - Le mage
 The Barton Mystery (1949) - Le domestique
 The Perfume of the Lady in Black (1949) - Un homme à la soirée chez Rouletabille (uncredited)
 Dominique (1950) - Oncle Charles
 Justice Is Done (1950) - Le professeur Georges Limousin (uncredited)
 Lost Souvenirs (1950) - Le notaire (uncredited)
 Topaze (1951) - Le vénérable vieillard
 Under the Sky of Paris (1951) - Un examinateur (uncredited)
 Rue des Saussaies (1951) - Le chimiste
 La plus belle fille du monde (1951) - Un membre du cercle
 Great Man (1951) - Le professeur Peccavi
 Run Away Mr. Perle (1952) - Un docteur du train (uncredited)
 Les amours finissent à l'aube (1953) - (uncredited)
 The Slave (1953) - Le violoniste
 The Earrings of Madame De... (1953) - Un diplomate (uncredited)
 Napoleon Road (1953) - Un administrateur (uncredited)
 His Father's Portrait (1953) - Le premier clerc (uncredited)
 Stain in the Snow (1954) - Le professeur
 Leguignon guérisseur (1954) - Le notaire (uncredited)
 Queen Margot (1954) - Le procureur
 Black Dossier (1955) - M. de Montesson
 The Case of Doctor Laurent (1957) - Un docteur
 Madame et son auto (1958) - Licaire
 Vive Henri IV... vive l'amour! (1961) - (uncredited)
 Auguste (1961) - Un officiel (uncredited)
 Le monte-charge (1962)
 Bonne chance, Charlie (1962) - Berthier
 A Matter of Resistance (1966) - Plantier the Gardener (uncredited) (final film role)

External links

1889 births
1972 deaths
Actors from Rouen
20th-century French male actors
French male film actors
French male stage actors
Burials at Batignolles Cemetery